Comandante Fontana is an Argentinian city, located in Chaco Province in northern Argentina.

References

Populated places in Chaco Province